Tomáš Janda (born 27 June 1973) is a retired Czech football forward. He played for numerous clubs in the Gambrinus liga between 1993 and 2003. He also played for FC Seoul of the South Korean K League, then known as Anyang LG Cheetahs.

References

External links 
 Tomáš Janda statistics at gambrinusliga.cz 
 

1973 births
Living people
Czech footballers
Czech First League players
Dukla Prague footballers
FC Fastav Zlín players
FK Drnovice players
FK Teplice players
SK Dynamo České Budějovice players
FK Chmel Blšany players
FC Seoul players
K League 1 players

Association football forwards